The Grand Babylon Hotel is a 1916 British silent thriller film directed by Frank Wilson and starring Fred Wright, Marguerite Blanche and Gerald Lawrence. It is an adaptation of the 1902 novel of the same title by Arnold Bennett.

Synopsis
The daughter of an American millionaire assists a young European prince who faces kidnap.

Cast
 Fred Wright as Theodore Racksole  
 Marguerite Blanche as Nella Racksole  
 Gerald Lawrence as Jules  
 Lionelle Howard as Prince Eugen  
 Stewart Rome as Prince Aribert 
 Violet Hopson as Miss Spencer 
 Alma Taylor as Princess Anna  
 Charles Vane as Rocco  
 Henry Vibart as King of Ragatz  
 Johnny Butt as Sampson Levi

References

Bibliography
 Goble, Alan. The Complete Index to Literary Sources in Film. Walter de Gruyter, 1999.
 Low, Rachael. The History of the British Film 1914 - 1918. George Allen & Unwin, 1950.

External links
 

1916 films
British thriller films
British silent feature films
1910s English-language films
Films directed by Frank Wilson
1910s thriller films
Films based on works by Arnold Bennett
British black-and-white films
Hepworth Pictures films
1910s British films
Silent thriller films